Always Outnumbered, Always Outgunned is a 1997 crime novel by Walter Mosley.

Plot Summary
Ex-convict Socrates Fortlow lives in Watts, a tough Los Angeles neighborhood, and struggles to stay on the path of righteousness. He befriends a young boy named Darryl, who initially dislikes Socrates but grows to appreciate his mentorship. He counsels Corrina, a pretty 23-year old who works and wants to keep her husband who has no job. He counsels the husband, Howard, to step up lest he lose Corrina. After a few trials and tribulations, Socrates lands a job at a supermarket further on the west side of Los Angeles. He helps Darryl again as he stands up against gang members, and tries to make up for his past misdeeds by reaching out to an old flame.

Socrates finds himself in jail, having hit a man who struck a dog with his car and wanted to finish off the dog. Socrates carries the dog to a local vet, who later posts his bail. Through his savvy public defender, Socrates gets a suspended sentence. At the end of the novel Socrates does his final good deed, helping his friend, suffering from terminal cancer, find enough pain medication to end his own life.

Film, television or theatrical adaptations
 Always Outnumbered – 1998 television movie directed by Michael Apted, starring Laurence Fishburne as Socrates.

References

External links
 

1997 American novels
American crime novels
Novels by Walter Mosley
American novels adapted into films
Novels set in Los Angeles
W. W. Norton & Company books
American novels adapted into television shows